Tetrarch, Tetrarchs, or Tetrarchy may refer to:
 Tetrarchy, the four co-emperors of the Roman Empire instituted by the Emperor Diocletian
 Portrait of the Four Tetrarchs - a sculpture of the four co-emperors of the Roman Empire
 Herodian Tetrarchy, formed by the sons of Herod the Great
 Tetrarch, Military rank#Greek ranks in ancient Greek armies
 Tetrarch (novel), a 2003 novel by Ian Irvine
 Light Tank Mk VII Tetrarch, a British light tank of World War II
 The Tetrarch, a Thoroughbred racehorse
 The Tetrarchs of Ancient Thessaly under Philip II of Macedon
 The Tetrarchs of Galatia in Asia Minor
 Tetrarches, a rank in the Byzantine army
 Tetrarch, a 1981 fantasy novel by Alex Comfort
 Tetrarch (band), a nu metal band from Atlanta, Georgia
 Tetrarchy, a subdivision of the Royal Phalanx in 19th-century Greece
HMS Tetrarch is the name of the two vessels that have served in the Royal Navy

See also
Tetricus (disambiguation), 3rd century rulers of the Gallic Empire
Philip the Tetrarch, the ruler of the northeast part of his father's kingdom
Herod Antipas, the ruler of Galilee and Perea
Herod Archelaus, actually titled ethnarch, the ruler of Idumaea, Judea and Samaria